Velikuzhiyil Devadasan Rajappan (വി. ഡി. രാജപ്പൻ) was an Indian actor in Malayalam movies . He was a popular Kadhaprasangam artist in Kerala. He was born in Kottayam, Kerala. He was known for his inventive style in stand-up comedy in the late 1970s, 1980s and 1990s. He started his career in the 1980s mainly portraying comedian roles and has acted in more than 100 films in Malayalam. He is considered as the godfather of parody songs in Malayalam.

Family
He was born to Devadasan and Vasanthy at Kottayam. He was married to Sulochana and they have two sons, Rajesh and Rajeev. Rajesh works in M. G. University and Rajeev is a nurse in Doha. He was settled at Peroor, Ettumanoor. He died at a private hospital in Kottayam at the age of 72 on 24 March 2016.

Filmography
OK Chacko Cochin Mumbai (2005) as Jabbar
 Thalamelam (2004) as Psychiatrist
 Singaari Bolona (2003)
 Aala (2002)
 Layam (2001)
 Nagaravadhu (2001) as Ittichan 
 Aparanmaar Nagarathil (2001)
 Alibabayum Arara Kallanmarum (1998) as Gopalan 
 Man of the Match (1996) 
 Puthukkottayile Puthumanavalan (1995) as Gurukkal
 Kusruthikkaattu (1995) as Kariyachan
 Mangalam Veettil Manaseswari Gupta (1995) as Musthafa
 Meleparambil Aanveedu (1993)
 Souhrudam (1991) as Narayanan
 Nyayavidhi (1986) as David
 Kunjattakilikal (1986) as Dasappan
 Oru Nokku Kanan (1985) as Kunjandi
 Makan Ente Makan (1985) as Dasappan
 Pachavelicham (1985) as Thankavelu
 Akkacheede Kunjuvava (1985)
 Aanakkorumma (1985) as Balan
 Muhurtham Pathnonnu Muppathinu (1985)... Narayanan
 Mutharamkunnu P.O. (1985) as M. K. Sahadevan
 Itha Innu Muthal (1984) as 'Thacholi' Thankappan
 Ivide Ingane (1984) as Maniyan
 Muthodumuthu (1984) as Kuriachan
 Swarna Gopuram (1984) as Mathappan
 Sandhyaykkenthinu Sindooram (1984)
 Panchavadi Palam (1984)
 Veendum Chalikkunna Chakram (1984)
 Poochakkoru Mookkuthi (1984) as Keshu Pillai
 Aattakalasam (1983) as Dr. V. D. Rajappan
 Thimingalam (1983) as Union Secretary
 Sandhyakku Virinja Poovu (1983)
 Varanmaare Aavashyamundu (1983)
 Engine Nee Marakkum (1983)
 Kuyiline Thedi (1983) as Vetti Pattar
 Kakka (1982)

Kadhaprasangam
 Akkidi Pakkaran
 Amittu 
 Avalude Partsukal
 Chikayunna Sundari
 Ennennum Kurangettande
 Kidney
 Kumari Eruma
 Laharai Mukku
 Mak Mak
 Namukku Parkkan Chandanakadukal
 Priye Ninte Kura
 Pothuputhri
 Karutha Manavatty
 kottayam to kodambakkam

Death
V. D. Rajappan died on March 25, 2016 at 11:30 am in KIMS Hospital, Kottayam. He was suffering from diabetes and high blood pressure, which led to the paralysis of his leg. But cardiac arrest was the cause of death. He was cremated with full state honors on the next day at his house premises.

References

http://malayalam.oneindia.in/movies/starpage/2012/10/vd-rajappan-actor-cinema-amma-govt-help-health-105340.html
http://www.malayalamcinema.com/star-details.php?member_id=458
http://www.malayalachalachithram.com/profiles.php?i=1654

External links
V. D. Rajappan at MSI

1944 births
2016 deaths
Indian male film actors
Male actors in Malayalam cinema
Male actors from Kottayam
20th-century Indian male actors
21st-century Indian male actors